Luigi "Gigi" Weiss (born 17 December 1951) is a former Italian biathlete and ski mountaineer.

Weiss was born in Vattaro. Together with Angelo Genuin and Bruno Bonaldi, he placed first in the military team category in the 1975 Trofeo Mezzalama edition, which was carried out as the first World Championship of Skimountaineering.

At the 1979 Biathlon World Championships, Weiss won bronze in the 10 km sprint. This was the first medal for an Italian at the Biathlon World Championships, and as the race also counted in the World Cup, it was also the first podium finish for an Italian in the World Cup.

Biathlon results
All results are sourced from the International Biathlon Union.

Olympic Games

*Sprint was added as an event in 1980.

World Championships
1 medal (1 bronze)

*During Olympic seasons competitions are only held for those events not included in the Olympic program.

Further achievements
 1973: 3rd, Italian championships of biathlon
 1974: 3rd, Italian championships of biathlon, sprint
 1975: 3rd, Italian championships of biathlon, sprint
 1976:
 2nd, Italian championships of biathlon, sprint
 1977: 2nd, Italian championships of biathlon
 1978: 1st, Italian championships of biathlon, sprint
 1979:
 1st, Italian championships of biathlon
 2nd, Italian championships of biathlon, sprint
 1980:
 2nd, Italian championships of biathlon
 1981: 1st, Italian championships of biathlon, sprint
 1982:
 2nd, Italian championships of biathlon, sprint
 3rd, Italian championships of biathlon

References

External links
 

1951 births
Living people
Sportspeople from Trentino
Italian male biathletes
Italian male ski mountaineers
Biathletes at the 1976 Winter Olympics
Biathletes at the 1980 Winter Olympics
Olympic biathletes of Italy
Biathlon World Championships medalists
World ski mountaineering champions